Micajah is a given name. Notable people with the name include:

People 
Micajah Autry (1794–1836), American merchant, poet and lawyer who died in the Texas Revolution at the Battle of the Alamo
Micajah Burnett (1791–1879), American Shaker architect, builder, engineer, surveyor, mathematician, and town planner
Micajah Coffin (1734–1827), American mariner and politician who served as a member of the Massachusetts House of Representatives
Micajah Harpe (1748–1799), Scottish-born American serial killer, highwayman, and river pirate
Micajah Thomas Hawkins (1790–1858), U.S. Congressman from North Carolina from 1803 to 1809
Micajah C. Henley (1856–1927), American industrialist and inventor based in Richmond, Indiana
Micajah W. Kirby (1798–1882), American politician and New York state senator
Micajah Woods (1844–1911), American lawyer from Virginia, the Commonwealth's Attorney in Charlottesville, president of the Virginia Bar Association

Places
Micajah, West Virginia, town in West Virginia, United States

See also 
Micajah Heights, Massachusetts, neighborhood in Plymouth, Massachusetts, United States
Micajah Pond (Massachusetts), 20-acre (81,000 m) pond located in Plymouth, Massachusetts
Micaiah (disambiguation)